Samuel Frederick Biery Jr. (born November 11, 1947) is a United States district judge of the United States District Court for the Western District of Texas.

Education and career

Born in McAllen, Texas, Biery received a Bachelor of Arts degree from Texas Lutheran College in 1970 and a Juris Doctor from the Dedman School of Law at Southern Methodist University in 1973. He served in the United States Army Reserve from 1970 to 1976 where he became an E4. He was in private practice in San Antonio, Texas from 1973 to 1978. He was a judge on the County Court at law number two in Bexar County, Texas from 1979 to 1982. He was a judge on the 150th District Court, State of Texas from 1983 to 1988. He was a Justice of the Fourth Court of Appeals, State of Texas from 1989 to 1994.

Federal judicial service

On November 19, 1993, Biery was nominated by President Bill Clinton to a new seat on the United States District Court for the Western District of Texas created by 104 Stat. 5089. He was confirmed by the United States Senate on March 10, 1994, and received his commission on March 11, 1994. Biery was elevated to chief judge on June 1, 2010, his term as chief judge ended in late 2015. On April 29, 2013, his ruling on 35 Bar and Grille LLC, et. al. v. The City of San Antonio reached press notoriety for its use of puns, sexual innuendo and double entendres. 

In June 2022, Biery claimed that he does not read opinions handed down from the Fifth Circuit only to later claim his remarks were "courtroom banter".

References

External links
  

1947 births
Living people
Judges of the United States District Court for the Western District of Texas
People from McAllen, Texas
Military personnel from Texas
Texas Lutheran University alumni
United States district court judges appointed by Bill Clinton
United States Army soldiers
United States Army reservists
Dedman School of Law alumni
20th-century American judges
21st-century American judges